Kurt Lennart Söderberg (7 July 1941 – 13 October 2022) was a Swedish football player and manager. He won one cap for the Sweden national team in 1965

Playing career 
Söderberg was born in Torpshammar, but his family moved to Solna when he was three years old. He started playing football at age seven in Råsunda IS, later AIK. His nickname became Liston.

Söderberg played for AIK, GIF Sundsvall, Ljusdals IF and Ulriksdals SK between 1959 and 1972. He represented the Sweden U19, U21, B, and A teams between 1959 and 1965, winning one cap for the senior team.

Coaching career 
Söderberg coached Ljusdals IF, Ulriksdals SK, Gefle IF, Västerås SK, IFK Eskilstuna, Odds BK, Vasalunds IF, Ikast FS, Syrianska FC, Anorthosis Famagusta, IFK Malmö and Köpings FF.

Personal life and death
Söderberg died on 13 October 2022, at the age of 81.

References

1941 births
2022 deaths
People from Ånge Municipality
Sportspeople from Västernorrland County
Swedish footballers
Association football defenders
Sweden international footballers
AIK Fotboll players
GIF Sundsvall players
Allsvenskan players
Swedish football managers
Gefle IF managers
Västerås SK Fotboll managers
Odds BK managers
Ikast FS managers
Anorthosis Famagusta F.C. managers
Vasalunds IF players
Syrianska FC managers
IFK Malmö Fotboll managers
Swedish expatriate football managers
Expatriate football managers in Norway
Swedish expatriate sportspeople in Norway
Expatriate football managers in Denmark
Swedish expatriate sportspeople in Denmark
Expatriate football managers in Cyprus
Swedish expatriate sportspeople in Cyprus